Caprioglio is a surname. Notable people with the surname include:

 Debora Caprioglio (born 1968), Italian actress
 Ilaria Caprioglio (born 1969), Italian politician

See also
 Capriglio

Italian-language surnames